"Malibu Beach Nightmare" (also known simply as "Malibu Beach") is a single and EP released only in the UK by the Finnish rock and glam punk band Hanoi Rocks. The song is from their 1983 album, Back to Mystery City, but the single was released just before the album in the UK. The song was written by the band's guitarist and primary songwriter, Andy McCoy.

The EP's second song, "Taxi Driver", is from the band's third album, Self Destruction Blues, and was also released on the Love's An Injection EP and single. "Taxi Driver" was recorded almost in one take at Farmyard Studio, outside London. "Taxi Driver" remains one of Hanoi Rocks' most well-known songs. The EP's third song, and the single's B-side, "Rebel On The Run", was mixed by Dale "Buffin" Griffin and Pete "Overend" Watts and was recorded at Alaska Studio. The fourth song on the EP, "Beer And A Cigarette", was recorded in the same sessions as "Taxi Driver".

"Malibu Beach Nightmare" was covered by Peppermint Creeps on their 2008 album Cover Up.

Track listing

Personnel
Michael Monroe - Lead vocals, saxophone
Andy McCoy - Lead guitar
Nasty Suicide - Rhythm guitar
Sam Yaffa - Bass
Razzle - Drums
Gyp Casino - Drums on "Taxi Driver"

Hanoi Rocks songs
1983 songs
Songs written by Andy McCoy